Henry Benzie Wattie (3 June 1891 – 1 July 1916) was a Scottish professional footballer who played in the Scottish League for Heart of Midlothian as a forward.

Personal life 
Wattie was the youngest of five brothers and attended Boroughmuir High School. After serving four years in the Territorial Force, Wattie enlisted as a private in McCrae's Battalion of the Royal Scots during the First World War and was killed in Sausage Valley on the first day on the Somme. He is commemorated on the Thiepval Memorial.

Career statistics

References 

Scottish footballers
1916 deaths
British Army personnel of World War I
1891 births
Scottish Football League players
Heart of Midlothian F.C. players
Footballers from Edinburgh
Royal Scots soldiers
Military personnel from Edinburgh
Association football forwards
McCrae's Battalion
Tranent Juniors F.C. players
British military personnel killed in the Battle of the Somme
People educated at Boroughmuir High School
Scottish Junior Football Association players